Oued El Abtal is a town and commune in Mascara Province, Algeria. According to the 1998 census it has a population of 19,184.

References

USES LE DUC

Communes of Mascara Province